Persatuan Sepakbola Indonesia Purwodadi, commonly known as Persipur Purwodadi, or Persipur, is an  Indonesian football club based in Purwodadi, Grobogan Regency, Central Java. They compete in Liga 3. Their home ground is Krida Bakti Stadium.

History
The first time the club was founded was led by Suhartoyo, a sports teacher who teaches at Christian Middle school of Purwodadi, there were several other names who took part. Among them, Marno, M. Supa'at and Tohari who are members of the Indonesian National Armed Forces, football leaders in Purwodadi saw that at that time many football clubs had sprung up but there was no parent organization that accommodated them.

In 1970, Persipur began to participate in the official PSSI competition. Both for junior and senior teams. however, for almost five years of participating in the competition, Persipur has not had any outstanding achievements, the condition of football in Grobogan from 1975 to 1980 seemed a vacuum.

In 1981, football in Grobogan began to thrive again, after the position of General Chairperson of Persipur was taken over by Sutarmanto BA. Under his leadership, Persipur returned to take part in the official PSSI competition more seriously.

Mascot 
Persipur Purwodadi has a mascot which is a Javanese Frog which is green and named Si Dodi which means Si Kodok Purwodadi.

Honours
 2011/12 : Position 6th Division 1 (Promotion to Premier Division)
 2012/13 : Position 7th Premier Division

References

External links
Persipur Purwodadi at Liga-Indonesia.co.id
 

 
Football clubs in Indonesia
Football clubs in Central Java
Association football clubs established in 1969
1969 establishments in Indonesia